is a Japanese manga series written by Shō Makura and illustrated by Takeshi Okano. It was serialized in Shueisha's magazine Weekly Shōnen Jump from September 1993 to May 1999. The manga ran for 276 chapters and was compiled into 31 tankōbon volumes. The series follows Meisuke Nueno, aka Nūbē, the homeroom teacher for Class 5–3 at Dōmori Elementary. More than a teacher, however, he is a skilled exorcist, protecting the town of Dōmori from supernatural threats with strength borrowed from a powerful demon sealed in his left hand—a technique he calls the Demon's Hand. The manga was adapted into a 49-episode anime series by Toei Animation, and aired from April 1996 to August 1997 on TV Asahi. The anime resulted in three movies and three OVA episodes.

A spin-off story for Izuna Hazuki the itako-girl, Reibaishi Izuna: The Spiritual Medium, was serialized in Oh Super Jump and later in Super Jump from July 2007 to October 2011. A sequel to the spin-off, titled Reibaishi Izuna: Ascension started in November 2011 and finished in June 2016. In May 2014, a Jigoku Sensei Nūbē direct sequel has started with the premise of ten years having passed, with Kyoko becoming a teacher at the Dōmori Elementary and Nūbē returning to the school from Kyushu. The manga finished in December 2018. A sequel titled Jigoku Sensei Nūbē S started in Saikyō Jump in August 2018.

As of December 2014, the Jigoku Sensei Nūbē manga had 24 million copies in circulation.

Plot

What seems like a normal day at Dōmori Elementary is disrupted by some weird phenomenon, usually targeting one of Nūbē's own students. Nūbē is forced into action, most often using the power of the Demon's Hand to assist in solving the problem, but occasionally the solution lies either in another of his spiritual weapons, or somehow reasoning with or appeasing the threatening entity. By the end, things always seem to get back to normal, with Nūbē and his students having learned something from the experience. Most of the series retains an episodic formula, forgoing an overarching storyline in favor of more character-driven action, although there are several recurring antagonists throughout, as well as some longer story arcs towards the end of the series.

Media

Manga

Jigoku Sensei Nūbē is written by Shō Makura and illustrated by Takeshi Okano. The manga was serialized in Shueisha's Weekly Shōnen Jump from September 6, 1993, to May 24, 1999. Thirty-one tankōbon volumes were published between January 11, 1994, and September 3, 1999.

Spin-offs
A spin-off story for Izuna Hazuki the itako-girl, titled Reibaishi Izuna: The Spiritual Medium, started in Shueisha's seinen magazine Super Jump in the August 2007 issue. The series was transferred to Super Jump on September 8, 2010. It ran in the magazine until its suspension on October 12, 2011. Ten tankōbon volumes were published by Shueisha between August 4, 2008, and December 2, 2011.

The manga was then transferred to Shueisha's Grand Jump, but renamed as Reibaishi Izuna: Ascension, starting on November 16, 2011. It was transferred to Grand Jump Premium on August 27. The manga finished on June 22, 2016. Ten tankōbon volumes were published between April 19, 2012, and December 2, 2016.

A one-shot chapter Jigoku Sensei Nūbē: Ōmagatoki was published in Grand Jump on April 2, 2014. A to sequel to the original series, Jigoku Sensei Nūbē Neo, started in Grand Jump Premium on May 28, 2014. It was transferred to Grand Jump on July 16 of the same year. Jigoku Sensei Nūbē Neo was simultaneously serialized in Shueisha's shōnen manga magazine Saikyō Jump from August 5, 2016 to June 1, 2018. The series finished on December 5, 2018. Shueisha collected its chapters in seventeen tankōbon volumes, released from October 3, 2014, to January 4, 2019.

Another series, Jigoku Sensei Nūbē S, was serialized in Saikyō Jump from August 3, 2018, to April 1, 2021. This is a sequel to Jigoku Sensei Nūbē Neo. Shueisha collected its chapters in four tankōbon volumes, released from March 4, 2019, to June 4, 2021.

Anime

An anime adaptation produced by Toei Animation aired on TV Asahi between April 13, 1996 and August 7, 1997.

Films
Three movies have been released. The first movie Jigoku Sensei Nūbē was released on July 6, 1996. A second anime film titled, Jigoku Sensei Nūbē: Gozen 0 toki Nūbē Shisu, premiered on March 8, 1997. The third anime film titled Jigoku Sensei Nūbē: Kyoufu no Natsu Yasumi! Asashi no Uni no Gensetsu premiered on July 12, 1997.

Original video animations
Three OVAs were released. The first OVA Kessen! Yōjin no jutsu VS kabeo was released in June 1998. The second OVA Nazonazo nana fushigi BUKIMI chan was released in July 1998. The third OVA Shijō saidai no gekisen! Zekki raishū!! was released in May 1999.

Video games
A video game was released in Japan on the PlayStation in 1997. Nūbē and Yukime became support characters in the 2006 Nintendo DS game Jump Ultimate Stars, with Hiroshi and Kyoko as help characters. Nūbē later appeared as a playable character in the 2014 PlayStation 3/PlayStation Vita game J-Stars Victory VS. Both versions of the game were released the following year in Europe and North America alongside a PlayStation 4 port, marking the first release of Jigoku Sensei Nūbē material outside Japan.

Drama
A Japanese television drama was announced in June 2014. The series premiered on Nippon TV on October 11, 2014. The cast includes Ryuhei Maruyama as Nūbē, Mirei Kiritani as Ritsuko Takahashi, Mokomichi Hayami as Kyōsuke Tamamo, Mizuki Yamamoto as Izuna Hazuki, Hideki Takahashi as Mugenkai Jikū and Kang Ji-young as Yukime. The ten-episode television series finished on December 13, 2014.

Reception
As of December 2014, the manga had 24 million copies in circulation.

References

External links

Toei's official Nūbē site 
Nūbē television drama official site 

Hell Teacher Nūbē
1993 manga
1996 anime OVAs
1996 anime films
1996 anime television series debuts
1997 anime films
Comedy anime and manga
Dark fantasy anime and manga
Exorcism in anime and manga
Fiction about urban legends
Shueisha franchises
Shueisha manga
Shōnen manga
TV Asahi original programming
Toei Animation original video animation
Toei Animation television
Yōkai in anime and manga